Luray may refer to:
 Luray, Eure-et-Loir, a commune in the Eure-et-Loir département, France
 Luray, Indiana
 Luray, Kansas
 Luray, Missouri
 Luray, Ohio
 Luray, South Carolina
 Luray, Tennessee
 Luray, Virginia
 Luray Caverns, Virginia